One America Plaza is the tallest building in San Diego, California and a prominent fixture in the waterfront district of the downtown San Diego skyline. The 34-story, obelisk-shaped tower was designed by Helmut Jahn of Murphy/Jahn Architects and KMA Architecture.  The top of the building bears a striking resemblance to the end of a Phillips head screwdriver and has a similar appearance to Two Liberty Place in Philadelphia also designed by Jahn, which is a year older. The building is the maximum height permitted by the US Federal Aviation Administration for a structure in downtown San Diego due to its close proximity to San Diego International Airport.

One America Plaza was purchased by the real estate development firm, Irvine Company, in February 2006 for US$300 million.

The America Plaza San Diego Trolley station is located on the ground floor of the building between the main building and the Museum of Contemporary Art San Diego.

The building's elevators are supplied by Mitsubishi Electric and travel at a little over 7 m/s (1400 fpm), making them the fastest in San Diego.

See also
List of tallest buildings in San Diego
List of tallest buildings in California

Notes

References

External links 

One America Plaza at Irvine Company

Office buildings completed in 1991
Skyscraper office buildings in San Diego
1991 establishments in California
Shimizu Corporation
Helmut Jahn buildings